"I Don't Care" is a song by South Korean girl group 2NE1 from their eponymous debut extended play, 2NE1 (2009). Written and produced by Teddy Park and Kush, the song was released as the EP's second lead single on July 1, 2009 by YG Entertainment. The track has been characterized as a mid-tempo dance-pop track that incorporates elements of R&B and reggae, and was noted for marking a stylistic shift in the group's mainly previous hip-hop image. Lyrically, the song revolves around the theme of independence after a break up. 

A commercial success following its release, "I Don’t Care" became one of the country’s most popular songs of 2009. It won various awards, including multiple Mnet Asian Music Awards and Cyworld Digital Music Awards. The accompanying music video for the single was directed by Cha Eun-taek and was filmed over the course of two days in late June. It features the members visiting a fortune teller who then freezes time in order to play sabotage on their cheating boyfriends. 

To promote the single, 2NE1 appeared on various music programs in South Korea throughout the months of July and August 2009. Two remix versions of the song were recorded and released to digital outlets: a reggae mix and a remix by Son Baek-young. A Japanese version of the track was later added to the group's debut Japanese studio-album, titled Collection (2012).

Background and release
On June 25, 2009, YG Entertainment announced that a new single, titled "I Don't Care", would be released on July 1, with the group's debut mini-album set to be released soon thereafter on July 8. The single follows the first lead single "Fire", which was released in May and was met with positive critical and commercial reception. The song marked a change in the group's image, as "Fire" showcased a stronger and edgier feel; in contrast, YG Entertainment CEO Yang Hyun-suk stated that "I Don't Care" would enable the group to display a softer and more feminine image. In an interview, member CL stated that the song was "a warning message for the men and advice for the women". "I Don't Care" was then officially released for digital download and streaming on July 1, 2009 as the second single off of the mini-album.

Two remixes of "I Don't Care" were also recorded and made available for digital download, an unplugged reggae version mix that was released on September 3, 2009 and a remix by former 1TYM rapper Song Baek-kyoung which was released on September 28. The reggae mix was later added to the group's debut studio album To Anyone (2010). A Japanese-language version of the track was additionally recorded and included as part of the group’s first Japanese studio album titled Collection, which was released by YGEX on March 28, 2012.

On December 21, 2020, more than 11 years after its release, the song trended in the Philippines following a domestic incident that occurred a day earlier.

Music and lyrics

The release of "I Don't Care" marked a switch in image for the group, in comparison to 2NE1's debut single "Fire" earlier in the year, which carried a bold and fierce concept. According to YG Entertainment, "I Don't Care" was intended to possess a concept that focused on enhancing femininity rather than intensity, simultaneously allowing for a more "public friendly" image. 

Musically, the song has been characterized as a medium-tempo pop track, containing a somewhat softer melody as compared to the group's debut single, in addition to incorporating influences of R&B and reggae. Written in the key signature of C♯ major, the song contains a tempo of 132 beats per minute. The integration of reggae was made due to the perception that South Korea had previously been a wasteland for the reggae music market, since reggae is strongly associated with summer music around the world. It was reported that through "Fire", it showed that reggae could work well in Korea, and "I Don't Care" aimed to further advance reggae-like styles into the country's mainstream music scene. Lyrically, the songwriting revolves around the themes of independence and confidence. It depicts the emotions of someone feeling the sense of renewal after initializing a break up with their troubled lover.

Reception

"I Don't Care" was a commercial success, topping the daily charts in South Korea short after its release. It was ranked as the most downloaded track in the second week of July, and was subsequently named the month's best-selling single. Additionally, "I Don't Care" achieved first place on various South Korean music programs, including KBS's Music Bank, Mnet's M! Countdown, and SBS's Inkigayo. The group achieved their first triple crown (or three total wins) with the song on Inkigayo, and further led the Music Bank and M Countdown chart for multiple weeks.

In November 2009, "I Don't Care" was named music portal Bug's most downloaded song of the year; it led the chart with several of the group’s other songs in the top 100, making 2NE1 the act with the most Bugs top 100 songs in during the course of 2009. In January 2010, the song was ranked at number one on the year-end popular chart compiled by Cyworld, thus becoming the third consecutive track by a YG group to rank at the top of the annual chart, with the previous two tracks being "Lies" (2007) and "Haru Haru" (2008) by labelmate Big Bang. 
"I Don't Care" won numerous accolades, including Song of the Year at both the 2009 Mnet Asian Music Awards and Cyworld Digital Music Awards. In doing so, 2NE1 became the first group to win a daesang (grand prize) in the same year of debut.

Music video and promotion
The music video for "I Don't Care" premiered on Melon on July 9, 2009, and was uploaded to YG Entertainment's official YouTube channel on August 27. It was later re-uploaded to the group's official channel on September 5, 2010. The video was directed by Cha Eun-taek, who had previously directed the video for labelmate Big Bang's "Lies", and was filmed over the course of two days on June 22 and 23, 2009. It features the members going to a fortune teller for advice after finding out about their cheating boyfriends over the phone. The fortune teller then freezes time and the members set off to find their boyfriends, who are seen flirting with other girls. They then set them up in unfavorable positions and play sabotage on them for fun. Actor Lee Jong-suk plays Dara's boyfriend in the music video.

Promotions for the single featured 2NE1 appearing on various music programs in South Korea throughout the months of July and August. The group debuted the song live on KBS2's Music Bank on July 10. The performance was met with positive reception among netizens, who complimented the youthful choreography matching the soft reggae melody, and further praised 2NE1 for their ability in showcasing a "different charm". The song went on to achieve the first place position for multiple weeks on Music Bank, M! Countdown, and Inkigayo. It led the Music Bank chart for 5 consecutive weeks, becoming only one of the handful songs to do so. An unplugged "reggae" version of the song was performed on Inkigayo on August 30, signaling the end of regular promotions for the song. However, due to the remix's popularity, it was further released to digital outlets on September 3.

Track listing
 Digital download
 I Don't Care – 3:59
 I Don't Care – Remixes
 I Don't Care (Reggae Mix Version) – 3:52
 I Don't Care (Baek Kyoung Remix) – 4:14

Accolades

Notes

References

External links
 
 

2009 singles
2NE1 songs
YG Entertainment singles
Songs written by Teddy Park
Korean-language songs
2009 songs